James Alonzo Walker (September 20, 1918 – August 23, 2004) was an American aviator from Manning, South Carolina who served as a Tuskegee Airman during World War II. He flew more than 102 missions in the European Theatre of WWII, and was shot down in action over Serbia at the time occupied Kingdom of Yugoslavia by Third Reich ( Germany). He was saved in Halyard Mission known in Serbian as (Operation Air Bridge) in July 1944t, by Chetniks and general Dragoljub Draža Mihailović. He served in the military until 1964. He became the first African American commander of an integrated unit in 1950.

Early life
He was born in Manning, South Carolina and his parents were James and Daisy. Walker went to High School in Baltimore, Maryland. He went to Hampton Institute in Virginia. Before joining the Tuskegee Airman Walker had 90 hours of flight time.

Career

Walker enlisted as a cadet and began military service in July 1941. He was assigned to the 99th Pursuit Squadron 332nd Fighter Group on  June 1, 1942. Walker was in class Class 43-E-SE. Walker was shot down over the in Serbia. He was missing for 30 days before returning to his unit. He piloted a  P-40 Warhawk in Europe during WWII. When he was shot down he came across an armed teen: Aleksandar Zivkovic. The teen helped Walker elude the enemy and helped him get back to his unit 39 days later.  Walker met with Zivkovic a half a century later and thanked him. After that he was saved in Mission Haylard by Chetniks and general Dragoljub Draža Mihailović and was transported to Italy.

In 1950 at Langley Air Force BaseWalker was the first African American officer to have command of an unsegregated unit.

Walker had served for 26 years eventually retiring with the rank of Lieutenant Colonel.

Awards and honors
Air Medal with three oak leaf clusters and four battle stars
2006 Congressional Gold Medal, awarded to Tuskegee Airmen
Distinguished Flying Cross (United States)

See also 

 Executive Order 9981
 List of Tuskegee Airmen
 List of Tuskegee Airmen Cadet Pilot Graduation Classes
 Military history of African Americans
 The Tuskegee Airmen (movie)

References

Notes

External links
 Fly (2009 play about the 332d Fighter Group)
 Tuskegee Airmen at Tuskegee University
 Tuskegee Airmen, Inc.
 Tuskegee Airmen National Historic Site (U.S. National Park Service)
 Tuskegee Airmen National Museum

Tuskegee Airmen
Military personnel from South Carolina
1918 births
2004 deaths
United States Army Air Forces officers
Aviators from South Carolina
African-American aviators
21st-century African-American people
Recipients of the Distinguished Flying Cross (United States)